The men's 100 metre freestyle event at the 1984 Summer Olympics was held in the McDonald's Olympic Swim Stadium in Los Angeles, California, on July 31, 1984. There were 68 competitors from 45 nations. Nations were limited to two swimmers each, down from three in prior Games. The event was won by Rowdy Gaines of the United States, the nation's third victory in four Games—with only the boycotted 1980 Olympics missing. Overall, it was the eleventh victory for an American in the men's 100 metre freestyle, most of any nation. Mark Stockwell of Australia took silver. Swedish swimmer Per Johansson repeated as bronze medalist, only the seventh man to earn multiple medals in the event.

Background

This was the 19th appearance of the men's 100 metre freestyle. The event has been held at every Summer Olympics except 1900 (when the shortest freestyle was the 200 metres), though the 1904 version was measured in yards rather than metres.

One of the eight finalists from the 1980 Games returned: bronze medalist Per Johansson of Sweden. The reigning gold medalist, and 1982 world champion, Jörg Woithe of East Germany, was absent due to the Soviet-led boycott. World runner-up Rowdy Gaines had missed the 1980 Games due to the American-led boycott at the peak of his ability; four years later, he was still favored. Johansson had taken third at worlds.

With a large field and a reduced maximum per nation, many nations new to the event were able to compete. The Bahamas, Bahrain, the People's Republic of China, Chinese Taipei, Fiji, Honduras, the Netherlands Antilles, San Marino, Suriname, Swaziland, and Uganda each made their debut in the event. The United States made its 18th appearance, most of any nation, having missed only the boycotted 1980 Games.

Competition format

This freestyle swimming competition used a new A/B final format. The competition consisted of two rounds: heats and finals. The swimmers with the best 8 times in the semifinals advanced to the A final, competing for medals through 8th place. The swimmers with the next 8 times in the semifinals competed in the B final for 9th through 16th place. Swim-offs were used as necessary to determine advancement.

Records

Prior to this competition, the existing world and Olympic records were as follows.

The following records were established during the competition:

Schedule

All times are Pacific Daylight Time (UTC-7)

Results

Heats

Rule: The eight fastest swimmers advance to final A, while the next eight to final B.

Finals

Final B

Final A

The Australian team protested the final, arguing that the start had not been fair. The Americans had experience with the starter and knew he had a tendency toward a quick trigger. The Australian protest was disallowed.

References

External links
 Official Report
 USA Swimming

F
Men's events at the 1984 Summer Olympics